In enzymology, a 2-ethylmalate synthase is an enzyme that catalyzes the chemical reaction

acetyl-CoA + H2O + 2-oxobutanoate  (R)-2-ethylmalate + CoA

The 3 substrates of this enzyme are acetyl-CoA, H2O, and 2-oxobutanoate, whereas its two products are (R)-2-ethylmalate and CoA.

This enzyme belongs to the family of transferases, specifically those acyltransferases that convert acyl groups into alkyl groups on transfer.  The systematic name of this enzyme class is acetyl-CoA:2-oxobutanoate C-acetyltransferase (thioester-hydrolysing, carboxymethyl-forming). Other names in common use include (R)-2-ethylmalate 2-oxobutanoyl-lyase (CoA-acetylating), 2-ethylmalate-3-hydroxybutanedioate synthase, propylmalate synthase, and propylmalic synthase.  This enzyme participates in pyruvate metabolism.

References

 

EC 2.3.3
Enzymes of unknown structure